17 Crateris is a wide binary star system in the equatorial constellation of Hydra, located 90.5 light years away from the Sun. It is visible to the naked eye as a faint, yellow-white hued star with a combined apparent visual magnitude of 4.93. The system is traversing the celestial sphere with a relative proper motion of /y, and is moving away from the Earth with a heliocentric radial velocity of +5.8 km/s.

As of 2015, the two components of this system had a separation of  along a position angle of 210°. They are nearly identical F-type main-sequence stars with a stellar classification of F8V. The primary is slightly brighter at magnitude 5.64, while the secondary is magnitude 5.76.

References

F-type main-sequence stars
Crateris, 17
Binary stars
Hydra (constellation)
Hydrae, N
Durchmusterung objects
Crateris, 17
100286/7
056280
4443/4